3rd Fighter Division (3. Jagd Division) was one of the primary divisions of the German Luftwaffe in World War II. It was formed 1 May 1942 in Metz. The Division was redesignated 4. Jagd-Division on 15 September 1943 and reformed 15 September 1943 in Deelen from 1. Jagd Division.

Commanding officers
Generalleutnant Werner Junck (1 May 1942 - 15 September 1943)
Generalleutnant Kurt-Bertram von Döring (15 September 1943 - 1 October 1943)
Oberst Kurt Hentschel (1 October 1943 - 15 October 1943) (Acting)
Generalleutnant Kurt-Bertram von Döring (15 October 1943 - 9 November 1943)
Generalmajor Walter Grabmann (11 November 1943 - 4 April 1945)

See also
Luftwaffe Organisation

References

Air divisions of the Wehrmacht Luftwaffe
Military units and formations established in 1942
Military units and formations disestablished in 1945